Rickea Velece Jackson (born March 16, 2001) is an American college basketball player for the Tennessee Lady Volunteers of the Southeastern Conference (SEC). She previously played for the Mississippi State Bulldogs.

High school career
Jackson played basketball for Detroit Edison Public School Academy in Detroit, Michigan. She led her team to three consecutive Class C state titles. As a senior, Jackson averaged 22 points and 6.5 rebounds per game, earning Michigan Miss Basketball honors and being selected to the McDonald's All-American Game and Jordan Brand Classic. She was named Michigan Gatorade Player of the Year for a second time. Jackson left as the program's all-time leading scorer, with 1,771 points. Mick McCabe of the Detroit Free Press considered her the greatest girls high school player in state history. Rated a five-star recruit and the fifth-best player in her class by ESPN, she committed to play college basketball for Mississippi State over offers from South Carolina, Tennessee, Texas, Rutgers, Ohio State and Louisville.

College career
On February 20, 2020, Jackson scored a freshman season-high 34 points for Mississippi State in a 92–85 win against Auburn in overtime. As a freshman, she averaged 15.1 points and 5.1 rebounds per game, earning second-team All-Southeastern Conference (SEC) and All-Freshman honors. Jackson won the Gillom Trophy as the top women's college player in Mississippi. In her sophomore season, she averaged 14.9 points and 4.4 rebounds per game. On December 1, 2021, Jackson scored a career-high 40 points in a 102–55 win over McNeese State. In January 2022, she entered the transfer portal, averaging an SEC-best 20.3 points and 6.7 rebounds per game in her junior season. Jackson announced that she would transfer to Tennessee.

National team career
Jackson represented the United States alongside her Mississippi State teammates at the 2019 Summer Universiade in Italy. She led the tournament with 22.2 points per game and won a silver medal. In 3x3 basketball, Jackson played at the 2019 FIBA 3x3 U18 World Cup in Mongolia, where she helped her team win the gold medal and was named to the all-tournament team.

References

External links
Mississippi State Bulldogs bio
Tennessee Lady Volunteers bio

2001 births
Living people
American women's basketball players
Basketball players from Detroit
Small forwards
Power forwards (basketball)
Mississippi State Bulldogs women's basketball players
Tennessee Lady Volunteers basketball players
McDonald's High School All-Americans
Universiade silver medalists for the United States
Universiade medalists in basketball
Medalists at the 2019 Summer Universiade